Hawthorne is an unincorporated community, located in the town of Hawthorne, Douglas County, Wisconsin, United States.

County Road B serves as a main route in the community.  U.S. Highway 53 is nearby.

The community is located 7.5 miles west of Lake Nebagamon; and 22 miles southeast of the city of Superior.

Hawthorne has a post office with ZIP code 54842.

History
Hawthorne was founded in 1885. It was named for W. B. Hawthorne, a lumberman. A post office has been in operation in Hawthorne since 1885.

References

Unincorporated communities in Douglas County, Wisconsin
Unincorporated communities in Wisconsin